Scopula praesignipuncta is a moth of the  family Geometridae. It is found on the Ryukyu Islands.

References

Moths described in 1920
praesignipuncta
Moths of Japan